Great Ormesby railway station was a station in Ormesby St Margaret, Norfolk. It was opened in 1877 and later became part of the Midland and Great Northern Joint Railway route bringing holiday passengers from the Midlands to the Norfolk coastal resorts. It was closed in 1959 along with the rest of the line.

Little Ormesby Halt

A halt at Little Ormesby opened in July 1933, the same time as Scratby and California Halts, to serve the local holiday industry. Little Ormesby was not well patronised and closed after a single season.

References

Disused railway stations in Norfolk
Former Midland and Great Northern Joint Railway stations
Railway stations in Great Britain opened in 1877
Railway stations in Great Britain closed in 1959